New World Disorder may refer to:

 New World Disorder (album), a 1999 album by Biohazard
 New World Disorder (film), a 1999 film starring Rutger Hauer and Andrew McCarthy

See also 
 New Disorder Records, an independent record label
 NWD (disambiguation)
 New World Order (disambiguation)
 Chaos (disambiguation)